Martell may refer to:

People

Martell Covington, American politician
Clark Martell (born 1960), neo-Nazi Skinhead
Edward Martell (1918–1995), former radiochemist for the US National Center for Atmospheric Research
Hugh Martell (1912–1998), Royal Navy officer
Jaeden Martell (born 2003), American actor
Karl Martell (Charles Martel), Majordomo and Duke of the Franks; victor of the Battle of Tours (732)
Karl Hermann Martell (1906–1966), German actor
Lena Martell (born 1940), Scottish singer
Maxine Martell (born 1937), American artist
Piera Martell (born 1943), Swiss singer
Martell Robinson (born 1976), American drag queen known as Jasmine Masters
Tate Martell (born 1998), American football player
Vince Martell (born 1945), lead guitarist of the band Vanilla Fudge

Places

Italy 
Martell, South Tyrol, a municipality in South Tyrol
Martelltal, a valley in South Tyrol

United States 
Martell, California
Martell, Nebraska
Martell, Wisconsin, a town
Martell (community), Wisconsin, an unincorporated community

Other uses
Martell (cognac), a cognac manufacturer
House Martell, a fictional family in George R. R. Martin's A Song of Ice and Fire
"Martell", a song by The Cribs

See also
Martel (disambiguation)
Martela